Jagdpanzer (JgPz) is the name given in German to a heavily-armoured, tracked tank destroyer, although it may also be used for other kinds of self-propelled guns.  Translated from the German language, Jagdpanzer is "hunting tank".

It typically refers to anti-tank variants of existing tank chassis with a well-armoured casemate fixed superstructure, mounting an anti-tank gun with limited traverse in the front, and classed by the western Allies of World War II as a tank destroyer.

History
The Jagdpanzer designs followed on from the more lightly armoured Panzerjäger ("tank hunter") designs, which took an anti-tank gun and mounted it on top of a tank chassis with supplementary armour fitted around the gun crew. However, the armour had an open rear and top, almost never providing the crew with full protection from the elements. In addition, much experience was gained from the Sturmgeschütz series of assault guns for infantry support, which already used heavily armoured casemates, completely enclosing the vehicle's crew. Although they were associated with artillery and infantry support, they were often used in the anti-tank role.

Tactical use
On the battlefield, when the Germans had to retreat, their line of retreat would preferably pass the location of their anti-tank units, who would use their superior firepower to stop the enemy, perhaps even open the possibility of a counter-attack. Due to the lack of a turret and the armour being concentrated at the front, the ideal combat situation for Jagdpanzer units was in the planned ambush, and the skill of the commander of such units lay in correctly choosing and preparing such places long before needed.

Types
The list below comprises all of the Jagdpanzer type tank destroyers made by Germany and other Axis nations. That is, all of the Axis purpose-designed tank destroyers with fully enclosed casemate-style armor. The tank destroyers are sorted by the starting date of their production.

Post-war
After the war, the name Jagdpanzer was kept in use in the Bundeswehr for a number of armoured vehicles used for anti-tank duties. This included the casemate-style Kanonenjagdpanzer carrying a 90 mm gun and the Raketenjagdpanzers. The first Raketenjagdpanzer was the Raketenjagdpanzer 1 built on the chassis of the SPz Lang HS.30 and armed with SS.11 missiles. The Raketenjagdpanzer 2 was built on the same chassis as the Kanonenjagdpanzer, but was equipped with two SS.11 launch-rails instead of carrying a gun.

Later, the Raketenjagdpanzer 2 and the Kanonenjagdpanzer were upgraded to Jaguar 1 and Jaguar 2 tank destroyers, armed with HOT or TOW missiles.

See also
 Tank destroyer
 Assault gun

Notes

World War II tank destroyers of Germany

de:Jagdpanzer
ja:駆逐戦車
sr:Јагдтигар
zh:驅逐戰車